Flying Leathernecks is a 1951 American Technicolor action war film directed by Nicholas Ray, produced by Edmund Grainger, (who had produced Sands of Iwo Jima) and starring John Wayne and Robert Ryan. The movie details the exploits and personal battles of United States Marine Corps aviators during World War II. Marines have long had the nickname "leatherneck", hence the title.

Plot
Major Dan Kirby arrives at VMF-247 ("Wildcats") as the new commander when everybody in the unit was expecting Captain Carl "Grif" Griffin to take over. Kirby is strict and makes this understood from day one. Assigned to the Cactus Air Force during the Guadalcanal campaign, Kirby has few planes available and a lot to accomplish with a field attacked daily by the Japanese. His pilots are young and behave like "kids", sometimes disobeying orders and foolishly losing precious pilots and precious planes. Kirby is requiring maximum effort, and Captain Griffin is not as tough as Kirby wants. Griffin stays closer to his young pilots, one of them his own brother-in-law, Vern "Cowboy" Blithe.

Kirby for his part hates the decisions he has to make, knowing that he is sending pilots to their death, but the success of his missions is the most important thing to him. He keeps this secret from the rest of his squadron. The hard conditions of the war force Kirby to get even stricter with his exhausted pilots. He even refuses sick leave to men with malaria or to allow planes with problems to return to base. Tension between Griffin and Kirby soon peaks. Griffin recognizes the hardships Kirby faces, but he is often more driven by his sentimental side.

Kirby is a fan of low-level ground attacks to support the Marine units, but HQ does not approve of his tactics until Marines are dangerously imperiled by the Japanese. Kirby then adjusts squadron tactics, despite losing a number of pilots while trying to prove his point. In his most successful operation, he leads his squadron in an attack on a huge Japanese convoy – a scene likely based on the Naval Battle of Guadalcanal.

Promoted to Lt. Colonel, Kirby is given the chance to organize low-level attack tactics in the US. Kirby then returns to the front, to the same unit and aircrew, now equipped with F4U Corsair fighters. Kirby leads his men against Japanese troops and Kamikaze attacks during the Battle of Okinawa.  During a crucial moment in the battle, to avoid splitting his formation, Griffin denies assistance to his brother-in-law Blithe, and as a result Blithe is killed. During the battle Kirby’s guns jam and he crashes his plane into a bomber. He is able to bail out but is injured and picked up by a Navy launch. Since he is now to leave the squadron, he has to appoint a successor. He appoints Griffin CO of VMF-247, as he understands that Griffin now can place the lives of his pilots second. They split with a friendly promise to meet again. Kirby admits that every moment in which he is required to make a decision is a nightmare, but that comes with the territory of being a leader under these circumstances.

Throughout the film, MSgt. Clancy, an old Marine veteran and comrade-in-arms of Kirby, provides comic relief. To the consternation of other units on the island, Clancy uses unorthodox creative methods to obtain provisions for his unit. His improvising helps the poorly equipped VMF-247, but at the end of the film, Clancy loses some stripes.

Cast
As listed in IMDb:

 John Wayne as Maj. Daniel Xavier Kirby
 Robert Ryan as Capt. Carl "Griff" Griffin
 Don Taylor as Lt. Vern "Cowboy" Blithe. Don Taylor was actually drafted into the USAAF but didn't see combat, taking part in publicity instead. 
 Janis Carter as Joan Kirby
 Jay C. Flippen as MSgt. Clancy, Line Chief
 William Harrigan as Dr. Lt. Cdr. Joe Curran
 Brett King as First Lt. Ernie Stark. Brett served in the USAAF earning a DFC and Purple Heart.
 Steve Flagg as Capt. Harold Jorgensen
 James Bell as Colonel
 Barry Kelley as Brigadier General
 Maurice Jara as Shorty Vegay
 Adam Williams as Lt. Bert Malotke
 James Dobson as Lt. Pudge McCabe
 Carleton Young as Col. Riley
 Michael St. Angel as Capt. Harold Jorgensen, Ops. Officer (as Steve Flagg)
 Gordon Gebert as Tommy Kirby

Background 
The film's screenplay was credited to James Edward Grant, based on a story by Kenneth Gamet, but some sources claim that Beirne Lay, Jr. was an uncredited contributor as well.

Director Nicholas Ray chose Robert Ryan to play opposite John Wayne because Ryan had been a boxer in college and was the only actor Ray could think of who could "kick Wayne's ass". The role of the more "human" Captain Griffin is a fictional one and contrasts with the more austere Major Kirby. Tim Holt was originally announced as part of the cast.

Production
As indicated in the opening scene of the film, Howard Hughes, himself a pilot with interests in aviation, bankrolled the production. Hughes made the decision to film in Technicolor, making use of color wartime combat footage.

Principal photography began in November 1950 at Camp Pendelton and El Toro Marine Corps bases and then moved to RKO-Pathé Studios in February 1951 for sound stage sequences. The fighter aircraft appearing in the first part of the film are not the historically accurate Grumman F4F Wildcats but Grumman F6F Hellcats, provided from the training units based at the nearby Marine Corps Air Station El Toro. The Wildcats did not continue in U.S. service after the war, while an appreciable number of Hellcats were available in 1951, the year the film was produced. In close-up shots, it is easy to make out the overpainted markings that adorned post-wars Hellcats. T-6 Texan trainers painted white were used as Zero fighters. The Vought F4U Corsair was also featured prominently in the last half of the film.

During filming, a near disaster occurred when "Air Boss" Paul Mantz and his photo crew, while filming a low-altitude attack, were caught in a premature dynamite detonation. The B-25 camera platform was badly damaged, but Mantz managed to successfully carry out an emergency landing.

Historic references
The role of Major Kirby portrayed in this film was inspired by real World War II flying ace Maj. John L. Smith for his missions over Guadalcanal in 1942. His actions in the war were renowned by the time the film was made. John L. Smith was awarded the Medal of Honor in 1943 and later promoted to Lt. Colonel, as was Kirby in the film.  A distinct similarity in appearance between Smith and actor John Wayne was noted.

Reception
Flying Leathernecks was critically received as another example of wartime aerial heroics. Howard Thompson in The New York Times commented that "As long as it stays in the air, Flying Leathernecks is an exciting thing to watch." Variety had a similar review, noting: "Actual color footage of battle action in the Pacific has been smartly blended with studio shots to strike a note of realism."

See also
 John Wayne filmography
 Close air support
 List of films featuring the United States Marine Corps

References

Notes

Citations

Bibliography

 Carlson, Mark. Flying on Film: A Century of Aviation in the Movies, 1912–2012. Duncan, Oklahoma: BearManor Media, 2012. .
 Hardwick, Jack and Ed Schnepf. "A Viewer's Guide to Aviation Movies." The Making of the Great Aviation Films. General Aviation Series, Volume 2, 1989.
 Orriss, Bruce. When Hollywood Ruled the Skies: The Aviation Film Classics of World War II. Hawthorne, California: Aero Associates Inc., 1984. .
 Parish, James Robert. The Great Combat Pictures: Twentieth-Century Warfare on the Screen. Metuchen, New Jersey: The Scarecrow Press, 1990. .
 Ricci, Mark and Boris and Steve Zmijewsky. The Films of John Wayne. New York: Citadel Press, 1970. .

External links

 
 
 
 

1951 films
1951 war films
American war films
American aviation films
Pacific War films
Films scored by Roy Webb
RKO Pictures films
Films directed by Nicholas Ray
Films about the United States Marine Corps
World War II aviation films
1950s English-language films
1950s American films